The 8th Golden Melody Awards ceremony was held at the Taipei International Convention Center on May 3, 1997.

References

External links
  8th Golden Melody Awards nominees
  8th Golden Melody Awards winners

Golden Melody Awards
Golden Melody Awards
Golden Melody Awards
Golden Melody Awards